The Academy League is a high school athletic league in Orange County that is part of the CIF Southern Section.

Members
As of 2019 the current members of the league are:
Brethren Christian High School
Capistrano Valley Christian High School
Liberty Christian High School
Pacifica Christian High School	
Saddleback Valley Christian Schools
Sage Hill School
Tarbut V' Torah

References

CIF Southern Section leagues